Maurice Tabet (1 February 1919 – 27 January 2014) was a Lebanese sports shooter. He competed at the 1960 Summer Olympics and the 1972 Summer Olympics.

References

External links
 

1919 births
2014 deaths
Lebanese male sport shooters
Olympic shooters of Lebanon
Shooters at the 1960 Summer Olympics
Shooters at the 1972 Summer Olympics
Sportspeople from Alexandria